Tuluganovka is a rural locality (a selo) and the administrative center of Tuluganovsky Selsoviet of Volodarsky District, Astrakhan Oblast, Russia. The population was 846 as of 2010. There are 18 streets.

Geography 
Tuluganovka is located 11 km southwest of Volodarsky (the district's administrative centre) by road. Stary Altynzhar is the nearest rural locality.

References 

Rural localities in Volodarsky District, Astrakhan Oblast